Edmund Sawyer (c.1586/7-1676), of London and Heywood, White Waltham, Berkshire, was an English Member of Parliament.

He was a Member (MP) of the Parliament of England for New Windsor in 1624, for Harwich in 1625 and for Berwick-upon-Tweed 1628.

References

1580s births
1676 deaths
17th-century English people
People from London
People from Berkshire
People of the Stuart period
Members of the Parliament of England (pre-1707)